Uneasy may refer to:

"Uneasy", episode of Long Island Medium
"Uneasy", a single by Laika (band)
"Uneasy", a song by Rita Ora from Ora
"Uneasy", a 2021 album by Vijay Iyer, Linda May Han Oh and Tyshawn Sorey